The 2007 1000 km of Valencia was the second round of the 2007 Le Mans Series season.  It took place on 6 May 2007, at Circuit de Valencia, Spain.

Official results
Class winners in bold.  Cars failing to complete 70% of winner's distance marked as Not Classified (NC).

Statistics
 Pole Position - #7 Team Peugeot Total - 1:23.489
 Fastest Lap - #8 Team Peugeot Total - 1:25.234
 Average Speed - 156.265 km/h

References

External links
 Le Mans Series - Valencia
 World Sports Racing Prototype - 1000 km of Valencia

Valencia
1000km of Valencia
1000km of Valencia